is a Japanese footballer who plays as a goalkeeper for Giravanz Kitakyushu.

Career statistics

Club

References

External links

2000 births
Living people
Association football people from Chiba Prefecture
Japanese footballers
Association football goalkeepers
Giravanz Kitakyushu players